Electoral district of Knox was an electoral district of the Legislative Assembly in the Australian state of Victoria.

Members for Knox

Election results

References

Former electoral districts of Victoria (Australia)
1976 establishments in Australia
2002 disestablishments in Australia